The 2004 season was the 92nd year of competitive soccer in the United States.

National team

The home team or the team that is designated as the home team is listed in the left column; the away team is in the right column.

Major League Soccer

Standings

Playoffs

MLS Cup

A-League

Standings

Eastern Conference

Western Conference

Playoffs

Final

Pro Soccer League

Standings

Atlantic Division

Northern Division

Southern Division

Western Division

Playoffs

Final

Lamar Hunt U.S. Open Cup

Bracket
Home teams listed on top of bracket

Final

American clubs in international competitions

Chicago Fire

San Jose Earthquakes

References
 American competitions at RSSSF
 American national team matches at RSSSF

 
2004